The Hampshire League 2004 was an English football league comprising teams located in Hampshire. It was formed in 2004, ran for nine seasons and served as a feeder league to Step 7 of the National League System. It was an unofficial continuation of the original Hampshire League which had controversially been disbanded earlier the same year.

History

The competition was originally formed in June 2004 following the expansion of the Wessex League, as not all the clubs from the recently disbanded Hampshire League were able to meet the stricter ground criteria and so re-formed a new successor competition. Other clubs from local leagues, plus the reserve teams of some of the newly elected Wessex League clubs, brought the founding complement up to 16 teams, although one failed to see through the inaugural season. Sporting BTC and Upham were the first league and cup winners, whilst externally Lyndhurst brought some extra credibility to the fledgling league when they won the Southampton Senior Cup.

The following three seasons were dominated by Mottisfont, who won three successive titles (the first two unbeaten!) as well as winning the 2005/06 League Cup. That season they were also beaten finalists in the Southampton Senior Cup.

The 2007/08 season saw the formation of the Hampshire Premier League, which accommodated the clubs from the recently disbanded Wessex League Division 2. The Hampshire Football Association then placed the new HPL at a higher level in its precedence list, thus making Hampshire League 2004 a feeder League. In May 2008 it was announced that the two county leagues were in talks about merging into a new two tier competition, which it was hoped would officially gain Step 7 status in the National League System. This merger ultimately did not occur, although the HPL was nonetheless awarded Step 7 feeder status.

By this time, on the pitch Netley Central Sports were now the dominant force, winning a consecutive double in 2008/09 and 2009/10, but once their purple patch faded the league became a more even playing field with three different sides clinching the title.

A decline in numbers saw the League operating with just 10 teams in the 2012/13 season - of which only three founder members (Broughton, Durley and Michelmersh & Timsbury) had participated each season. In June 2013 the inevitable happened, when the competition was dissolved with its remaining member clubs being invited to join the newly created Division 1 of the Hampshire Premier League.

Roll of Honour

A to Z of Clubs

Links
Hampshire League 2004 at the FCHD

Final Tables

References

 
Football in Hampshire
Defunct football leagues in England
Sports leagues established in 2004
2004 establishments in England
2000s in Hampshire